Valeriu "Valer" Toma (born 26 November 1957) is a retired Romanian rower. Competing in coxless pairs he won a gold medal at the 1984 Olympics, placing fourth in 1980. He also won a bronze medal in coxless fours at the 1982 World Championships.

References

1957 births
Living people
Romanian male rowers
Olympic rowers of Romania
Olympic gold medalists for Romania
Rowers at the 1980 Summer Olympics
Rowers at the 1984 Summer Olympics
Olympic medalists in rowing
Medalists at the 1984 Summer Olympics
World Rowing Championships medalists for Romania